Meskalamdug (mes-ug-du10, MES-KALAM-DUG "hero of the good land") was an early Sumerian ruler of the First Dynasty of Ur in the 26th century BCE. He does not appear in the Sumerian King List, but is known from a royal cylinder seal found in the Royal Cemetery at Ur, a royal bead inscription found in Mari, both mentioning him as King, and possibly his tomb, grave PG 755 at the Royal Cemetery at Ur. 

It has been suggested that Puabi may have been his second queen.

Royal seal
The existence of a "King Meskalamdug" is known for certain, from a seal discovered at the Royal Cemetery of Ur (cylinder seal U 11751, discovered in the tomb of a queen, PG 1054), which bears the title Meskalamdug Lugal "King Meskalamdug". The same name of "Meskalamdug" has been found inscribed on the grave goods of tomb PG 755 at the Royal Cemetery of Ur, but without the title "King", which has raised doubts about the identification of King Meskalamdug with the young man found in that rather small grave.

The seal is made of shell, with a core in lapis-lazuli. It shows two crossed lions attacking bulls, with Enkidu and a naked man in profile participating to the fight. It is now in the British Museum (BM 122536).

Mari bead
King Meskalamdug is again mentioned on a lapis-lazuli bead found in Mari, in the so-called "Treasure of Ur". It reads:

It is unclear how this bead came to be in Mari, which was quite far from Ur (about 700 kilometers to the northwest), but this points to some kind of relation between Ur and Mari at that time. The bead was discovered in a jar containing other objects from Ur or Kish, probably used as a dedication to a local temple. The God "Lugal-kalam" ("Lord of the Land") to whom the dedication is made, is otherwise known in a dedication by a local ruler Šaba (Šalim) of Mari, also as Lugal-kalam, or in the dedication of Ishtup-Ilum where he is named "Lugal-mātim" ("Lord of the Land"), and is considered identical with the local deity Dagan, or Enlil.

Tomb of Meskalamdug (PG 755)

The tomb of Meskalamdug, PG 755, discovered by English archaeologist Sir Leonard Woolley in the Royal Cemetery of Ur in 1924, contained numerous gold artifacts including a golden helmet with an inscription of the king's name. By observing the contents of this royal grave, it is made clear that this ancient civilization was quite wealthy. His wife's name was queen Ninbanda. Meskalamdug was also mentioned on a seal in another tomb with the title lugal (king), however because his own tomb lacked attendants, Woolley assumed that he was not royal. The controversy remains though, because he is named on a bead inscription discovered in Mari by French archaeologist André Parrot ten years later, as the father of king Mesannepada of Ur, who appears in the king list and in many other inscriptions.

Since tomb PG 755 lacks the monumental scale and splendor of other royal tombs at the Royal Cemetery of Ur, it has been suggested that it was not the tomb of king Meskalamdug himself, but rather a young prince of the same name, for example a son of king Meskalamdug and queen Nibanda. Julian Reade has suggested that tomb PG 755 was the tomb of a "Prince Meskalamdug", and that the actual tomb of the King Meskalamdug, known from seal U 11751, was tomb PG 789. Alternatively, it may be more likely that the Meskalamdug of the inscriptions in tomb PG 755, and the Meskalamdug of the royal seal are simply the same person, who took the royal title lugal at a late stage of his life.

Tomb artifacts (tomb PG 755)

An alternative: the "King's grave" (tomb PG 789)

According to Julian Reade tomb PG 755 was the tomb of a "Prince Meskalamdug", but the actual tomb of King Meskalamdug, known from seal U 11751, is more likely to be royal tomb PG 789. This tomb has been called "the King's grave", where the remains of numerous royal attendants and many beautiful objects were recovered, and is located right next to the tomb of Queen Puabi, thought to be the second wife of King Meskalamdug.

See also

Sumer
History of Sumer
Royal Cemetery at Ur
Near Eastern archaeology

References

Sources
Jane McIntosh: Ancient Mesopotamia. ABC-CLIO 2005, p. 73 (restricted online version (google books))
Leonard Woolley: The Sumerians. p. 38 (restricted online version (google books))

External links
Meskalamdug at Bartleby.com (Text snippet from  The Encyclopedia of World History (2001))

26th-century BC Sumerian kings
Sumerian kings
First Dynasty of Ur